Retes de Llanteno is a hamlet and council located in the municipality of Aiara, in Álava province, Basque Country, Spain. As of 2020, it has a population of 60.

Geography 
Retes de Llanteno is located 53km northwest of Vitoria-Gasteiz.

References

Populated places in Álava